The rolling stock on Singapore's Mass Rapid Transit (MRT) and Light Rail Transit (LRT) includes several models of electric multiple units and people mover systems respectively. They are primarily operated by SBS Transit and SMRT Trains.

Mass Rapid Transit (MRT) rolling stock

Current

Future

Work trains 
SMRT Trains was known to use the following vehicles for maintenance of way as of 2015:

In addition, SBS Transit has used a two-car MFV supplied by a joint venture between Plasser and Theurer and Speno and a railgrinder from Harsco and the Land Transport Authority is known to have procured multi-function vehicles and railgrinders  from MERMEC of Italy and Harsco respectively for the Downtown MRT Line and Thomson-East Coast MRT Line, general maintenance vehicles for the Downtown MRT Line from Gemac Engineering Machinery, as well as Bo-Bo battery-electric locomotives from CRRC Zhuzhou Locomotive. Engineering trains are also known to be interchangeable across different lines as shown with photos of a transfer of a multi-function vehicle between Bishan Depot and Kim Chuan Depot.

Contractors such as Gammon Construction are also known to have brought in their own work trains such as tampers for trackwork projects; SMRT used up to 14 road-rail vehicles provided by Gammon during the sleeper replacement from 2013 to 2016.

Light Rail Transit (LRT) rolling stock

Current

Future

References

Notes 

 
Underground rapid transit in Singapore
Singapore MRT and LRT
 
MRT and LRT